Emmanuel Philibert (8 July 1528 – 30 August 1580), known as  ("Ironhead", because of his military career), was Duke of Savoy from 1553 to 1580. He is remembered for the recovery of the Savoyard state (invaded and occupied by France when he was a child) following the Battle of St. Quentin (1557), and for moving its capital to Turin.

Life
Born in Chambéry, Emmanuel Philibert was the only child of Charles III, Duke of Savoy, and Beatrice of Portugal to reach adulthood. His mother was sister-in-law to Charles V, Holy Roman Emperor, and the future duke served in Charles's army during the war against Francis I of France, distinguishing himself by capturing Hesdin in July 1553. A month later, he became Duke of Savoy on the death of his father, but this was a nearly empty honour, as the vast majority of his hereditary lands had been occupied and administered by the French since 1536. Instead, he continued to serve the Habsburgs in hopes of recovering his lands, and served his cousin Philip II of Spain as Governor of the Netherlands from 1555 to 1559.

In this capacity, he personally led the Spanish invasion of northern France and won a brilliant victory at Saint-Quentin on 10 August 1557. He was also a suitor to Lady Elizabeth Tudor (the future Queen Elizabeth I), daughter of Henry VIII of England. Emmanuel Philibert finally recovered his lands following the Peace of Cateau Cambrésis signed between France and Spain in 1559, and he married his first cousin once removed, Margaret of France, Duchess of Berry, the sister of King Henry II of France. Their only child was Charles Emmanuel I of Savoy.

After the death of his uncle, Henry I of Portugal, on 31 January 1580, Emmanuel Philibert fought to impose his rights as a claimant to the Portuguese throne. However, he soon realised that he had quite a fragile position due to the claims of Philip II, who gained control of the country, thus uniting Spain and Portugal.

Emmanuel Philibert spent his rule regaining what had been lost in the costly wars with France. A skilled political strategist, he took advantage of various squabbles in Europe to slowly regain territory from both the French and the Spanish, including the city of Turin. He also purchased two territories. Internally, he moved his political capital from Chambéry to Turin and replaced Latin as the official language with French in the Duchy of Savoy and the Duchy of Aosta and with Italian in the Principality of Piedmont and the County of Nice. He was attempting to acquire the marquisate of Saluzzo when he died in Turin. Later, he was buried in the Chapel of the Holy Shroud of the Turin Cathedral, to which he had moved the Sindone in 1578.

Ancestry

References

Sources

See also

1580 Portuguese succession crisis

1528 births
1580 deaths
16th-century Dukes of Savoy
Princes of Savoy
Military personnel from Chambéry
Military personnel from Turin
Governors of the Habsburg Netherlands
Military leaders of the Italian Wars
Italian generals
Spanish generals
Claimant Kings of Jerusalem
Garter Knights appointed by Mary I
Knights of the Golden Fleece
Nobility from Turin